Donald Keith was a pseudonym for authors Donald (1888–1972) and Keith Monroe (1915–2003). They are best known for their series of stories in the Time Machine series, which were originally published in Boys' Life magazine between 1959 and 1989.  Some of the stories were combined into two books, Mutiny in the Time Machine (1963) and Time Machine to the Rescue (1967).

A few stories later in the series were written by Keith Monroe alone. The works of Donald Keith were often Keith Monroe's earlier attempts, to which his father, Donald Monroe, helped him. As a result, both men amalgamated their forenames into the pen name "Donald Keith" in order to credit both.

Donald Keith also contributed stories to Galaxy Science Fiction and Blue Book.

Time Machine stories in Boys' Life

Key to "Byline"
 DK – stated author is Donald Keith, the duo 
 KM – stated author is Keith Monroe, the son

Published books

References

External links

 List of Time Machine stories compiled by William S. Higgins

 Keith Monroe at the Encyclopedia of Science Fiction

American science fiction writers
American short story writers
Science fiction shared pseudonyms
American male short story writers
American male novelists
American children's writers